Spring Break Challenge is a one-off MTV reality game show spun off from MTV's long-running reality game show, The Challenge. Spring Break Challenge used various contestants from the precursor program as coaches of teams of new college-aged contestants. As with The Challenge, T. J. Lavin was the host of Spring Break Challenge.

The program aired from March 22–26, 2010 in Acapulco, Mexico during MTV's then-annual spring break coverage. This spin-off featured teams of college-aged friends in various challenges of old and new based on previous seasons of The Challenge. The Spring Break Challenge cast was made up of original contestants from colleges across the country, as well as alumni from previous seasons of The Real World, Road Rules, and the first Fresh Meat challenge serving as coaches.

Cast
Host: T. J. Lavin, BMX rider
Announcers: Evan Starkman (Real World/Road Rules Challenge: Fresh Meat) and Paula Meronek (The Real World: Key West)

Teams

Previous challenges used
Melt with You: Each crew must melt away an ice block to get to a key that unlocks a box containing puzzle pieces. The first team to get their key and solve their puzzle wins the challenge. Challenge from the Battle of the Sexes 2.
Oh Ring: A player from each team tries to wrestle a ring away from their opponent, while suspended above the ground from their feet. The first team to wrestle three rings away from their opponents wins. Challenge from The Ruins.
Turntable: Each crew must hold onto a rope on a giant spinning record against another team's crew. The last crew member standing wins the heat for their team, and the team that stays on the longest wins the entire challenge. Challenge from The Gauntlet.
Dangle Drop: Players are hung from a punching bag in the air and hold on until they fall off. The last player standing wins the elimination round for their crew. Challenge from the Battle of the Sexes 2.
Bird Feeder: Each crew member will put on a chicken suit and grab a mouthful of bird feed and meal worms and deposit it into a tube makeshifted in the shape of a chick. The team that has the most grams of bird feed wins the challenge. Challenge from The Inferno.
Pole Wrestle: Players are placed at the center of a circle and are asked to place both hands on a wooden pole approximately two feet (0.6 meter) in length. The first contestant to wrestle the pole out of his or her opponent's hands wins the heat. The first three out of five crew members to win stays in the game. Challenge from The Duel.
Balls In: Each crew member will try to run past an opposing player and get a ball into a tube, earning a point for their team. The team that reaches five points will win their respective heats and the team that gets to five the fastest will win the challenge. Challenge from The Inferno II.
Unbraided: Each team member is going to be connected to a rope that's woven into other crew members' ropes. Each crew member must unravel each other by going through each teammate's rope. The first team to "unbraid" themselves and drop their rings will win for their team. Challenge from The Inferno 3.
Hodge Podge (Spool, Bizarre Buffet & The Elevator): In a mixture of three different challenges, two crew members had to untangle themselves from a series of ropes intertwined through a bar maze, then two other crew members had to eat a delicacy consisting of hot chili peppers and sheep testicles, then the last crew member had to pulley themselves up an elevator and ring the bell. The first team to ring the bell wins the challenge while the last place team is eliminated. Challenges from The Ruins and The Duel II.
Assembly Required: Each team will disassemble a pyramid, transport the pieces to another location and reassemble the pieces again. The team that completes their pyramid and plants their flag will win the challenge. Challenge from The Gauntlet III.

Game progress

Elimination progress

Competition
 The team won the competition.
 The team did not win the competition.
 The team won the challenge that week.
 The team was not selected to go into the elimination round.
 The team won in the elimination round.
 The team lost in the elimination round and was eliminated.
 The team came in last place in the challenge and was automatically eliminated.
‡ The team's coach won the coaches challenge, which gave their team an advantage in the challenge.

Episodes

Most Memorable Player
A short segment was held by Paula and Evan on who they thought was the most memorable player of each challenge. Camila of Team Susie won this honor twice for licking a sandy piece of ice and freaking out after eating chili peppers.

Contestants later appearing in Challenge seasons
Two weeks after the filming of Spring Break Challenge, producers Bunim/Murray called Camila Nakagawa, and invited her to take part in the next season of the main series.

Challenge in bold indicates that the contestant was a finalist on The Challenge.

Notes

References

External links
 

Spring Break Challenge
Television series by Bunim/Murray Productions
2010s American reality television series
2010 American television series debuts
2010 American television series endings
MTV original programming
Television shows set in Mexico
Television shows filmed in Mexico